ATN Punjabi 5 is a Canadian pay television channel owned by Asian Television Network. It broadcasts Punjabi-language programming from India as well as local content produced by ATN.

ATN Punjabi 5 is a cultural and spiritual channel that caters to the Punjabi/Sikh communities in Canada.  Programming includes live Sikh events from around the globe, spiritual programming, and local cultural and religious events from various Sikh communities in Canada.

History

ATN Punjabi 5 originally launched on September 15, 2010 as ATN JUS Punjabi, in partnership with American-Punjabi broadcaster JUS Punjabi.  Via a programming supply agreement, ATN launched a Canadian version of the American service.

In October 2014, the channel was renamed 'ATN Punjabi 5' due to a loss of programming from JUS Punjabi.

External links

References 

Digital cable television networks in Canada
Punjabi-language television channels
Television channels and stations established in 2010
Punjabi-language television in Canada